Cab Calloway's Hi-De-Ho (also known as Hi-De-Ho) is an American musical short film directed by Fred Waller and released by Paramount Pictures in 1934. The film stars jazz bandleader Cab Calloway and actress Fredi Washington. In 2001, the film was reissued by Kino International in the DVD collection Hollywood Rhythm: Vol. 1-The Best Of Jazz And Blues.

Synopsis 
Bandleader Cab Calloway plays a ladies man who dates the wife (Fredi Washington) of a train porter who is frequently absent from home. Calloway and his Orchestra perform "Zaz-zuh-zaz" and "The Lady with the Fan" at the Cotton Club in Harlem.

Cast 

 Cab Calloway and his Orchestra
 Fredi Washington

Notable orchestra members in the film 

 Edwin Swayzee – trumpeter
 Al Morgan – double-bassist
 Eddie Barefield – saxophonist

References

External links 

 

1934 films
Paramount Pictures short films
American black-and-white films
1934 musical films
Jazz films
African-American musical films
1930s English-language films
1930s American films